Dinangourou (Dúŋà ɔ̀rù; Dinaŋguru) is a village and commune of the Cercle of Koro in the Mopti Region of Mali. Jamsay Dogon is spoken in the village. A weekly Sunday market is hosted in the village. The local surname is Goro.

References

External links
.

Communes of Mopti Region